Mrityunjaya Prasad was an Indian politician and son of Rajendra Prasad and Rajvanshi Devi who served as Member of 6th Lok Sabha from Siwan Lok Sabha constituency and Member of 4th Lok Sabha from Maharajganj, Bihar Lok Sabha constituency. He was the only member of family of Rajendra Prasad who joined politics.

Personal life 
He was born in 2 January 1906 in Ziradei, Siwan district. He was the founder-member of College of Commerce, Arts and Science, Patna.

References 

India MPs 1967–1970
India MPs 1977–1979
Date of death unknown
1906 births
Year of death missing